90.1 Spirit FM (DZRV 90.1 MHz) is an FM station owned and operated by the Roman Catholic Diocese of Bayombong in the Philippines. Its studios and transmitter are located at Maharlika Hi-way, Brgy. Luyang, Bayombong.

References

External links
Spirit FM Nueva Vizcaya FB Page

Radio stations established in 2000
Catholic radio stations
Radio stations in Nueva Vizcaya